The Treasurer-depute was a senior post in the pre-Union government of Scotland. It was the equivalent of the English post of Chancellor of the Exchequer.

Originally a deputy to the Treasurer, the Treasurer-depute emerged as a separate Crown appointment by 1614. Its holder attended the Privy Council in the absence of the Treasurer, but gained independent membership of the Council in 1587 and sat in the Parliament of Scotland as a Great Officer of State in 1593 and from 1617 onwards.

List of Treasurers-depute 

1547 James Forrester
1584: Sir Robert Melville
1604–1610: Sir John Arnot
1610–1621: Gideon Murray
1622–1631: Archibald Napier, 1st Lord Napier
1631–?: John Stewart, 1st Earl of Traquair
1636-1649: Sir James Carmichael
1661–1671: William Bellenden, 1st Lord Bellenden
1671–1682?: Charles Maitland, Lord Haltoun
1682–1684: John Drummond
1684–1686?: John Keith, 1st Earl of Kintore
1687–1689: Richard Maitland, Viscount Maitland
1690–1698: Alexander Melville, Lord Raith
1699–1703: Adam Cockburn of Ormiston, Lord Ormiston
1703: David Boyle, 1st Earl of Glasgow

 
Lists of political office-holders in Scotland
Political office-holders in Scotland
Monarchy and money